Reginald Dewayne Grimes (born November 7, 1976) is a former American football defensive lineman. He briefly played for the New England Patriots in 2000. Grimes played college football at Alabama.

His son, also named Reggie, is the highest ranked recruit from Tennessee and also the 4th highest ranked recruit at defensive end in the nation from the Class of 2020.

References

External links 
 Alabama Crimson Tide bio

1976 births
Living people
American football defensive linemen
Alabama Crimson Tide football players
New England Patriots players
Berlin Thunder players